Kalyanasundaram may refer to:
 B. Kalyanasundaram, an Indian cricketer
 K. Kalyanasundaram, an Indian politician
 Kalyanasundaram Higher Secondary School, a school in Thanjavur, India
 M. Kalyanasundaram, an Indian politician
 Pattukkottai Kalyanasundaram, an Indian poet
 Thiru. V. Kalyanasundaram, an Indian scholar